Tony Furey (born 2 August 1963) is  a former Australian rules footballer who played with North Melbourne in the Victorian Football League (VFL).

References

External links 		
		
		

		
Living people		
1963 births		
		
Australian rules footballers from Victoria (Australia)		
North Melbourne Football Club players